Pyotr Nikolayevich Durnovo (1845 in Moscow Governorate –  in Petrograd) was an  Imperial Russian lawyer, politician, and member of Russian nobility belonged to House of Durnovo. Known by anti-Tsarist revolutionaries in the era of the Russian Revolution of 1905 as "the counter-revolution's butcher."

Biography

Pyotr Durnovo was born in the Moscow Governorate to the noble Durnovo family in 1845.

Durnovo began his career in the naval and military service, transferred in 1881 to the Police Department of the Ministry of Internal Affairs, and from 1884 to 1893 was that department's director. He went on to high posts in other parts of the same ministry, including -a short term as its head (1905–06 ). His principal lire position during the last decade of his was that of member of the State Council.

A graduate of the Imperial Naval School and the Military/Naval Law Academy, he served in the Ministry of Justice reaching the position of Assistant Procurator of the Kiev Court of Appeals, until transferring to the Ministry of the Interior in 1881. Durnovo was appointed Director of Police in 1884 and remained in that position until 1893 when he was forced to resign due to a disagreement between himself and the Spanish Ambassador to Russia involving the misuse of police powers.  He was appointed to the Imperial Russian Governing Senate in 1893 where he distinguished himself.  In 1900, he was appointed Assistant Minister of the Interior in charge of Posts and Telegraph services at the request of Sipiagin.  He remained in this position until 1905 when he was appointed Minister of the Interior, on Witte's recommendation.

In his book on the Russian Revolution of 1905, Leon Trotsky describes Durnovo's appointment by Witte to the post: "This most foul specimen of the Russian bureaucracy's foul mores, this thievish official whom even the unforgettable Alexander III himself was obliged to throw out with the energetic words: "remove this swine," this Durnovo was now brought out of the rubbish bin to provide a counterweight to the "liberal" Prime Minister in the capacity of Minister of Home Affairs. [...] Durnovo, the master of the situation, rolled up his sleeves and got on with his bloody work as the counter-revolution's butcher."

Durnovo led campaigns against the freedom of the press during the 1905 Russian Revolution.

Immediately after the end of the final session of the Second Peasants' Congress of 1905, held in Moscow from 6–12 November, Durnovo, intent on crushing the resistance of the peasantry, issued the following orders: "Rioters to be exterminated immediately by force of arms, their dwellings to be burned down in the event of resistance.  Arbitrary self-rule must be eradicated once and for all - now.  Arrests would not serve any purpose at present and anyway it is impossible to try hundreds and thousands of persons.  It is essential that the troops should fully understand the above instructions. - P. Durnovo"

He retired from the position of Minister shortly after Witte's resignation from the Chairmanship of the Council of Ministers despite earlier differences between the two.

A letter to Nicholas II 
Durnovo was noted for his outspoken opposition to closer ties with the United Kingdom at the expense of relations with Germany which he expressed in his letter sent to Nicholas II in February 1914. In the letter Durnovo has set out his views and which were to be realized in the aftermath of World War I. He believed that German and Russian interests were complementary while a war between the two empires could result only in the destruction of the existing political orders of both. Durnovo foresaw an imminent war between Russia, France and Britain against Germany, Austro-Hungary, and Turkey. His memorandum accurately predicted Russia's defeat and demoralization of the Imperial Army, elimination of existing legislative institutions, intellectual opposition, and Monarchy favoring "social revolution in its most extreme form the way and evolution of which is hard to predict". The document was found amongst the papers of Tsar Nicholas following the February Revolution of 1917. It's unknown whether Tsar had read it or not.

Death 
Pyotr Durnovo died in September 1915 at his villa in Petrograd. He was the last Russian Imperial Minister of Interior to die from natural causes. His six successors (Pyotr Stolypin, Alexander Makarov, Nikolay Maklakov, [Nikolay Shcherbatov (died in Starnberg, Bavaria, Germany)], Alexey Khvostov, Boris Stürmer, [Alexander Khvostov (died in Yelets, RSFSR [Russia])], Alexander Protopopov) were all assassinated or murdered during the Red Terror. Only Alexander Makarov, Nikolay Maklakov, Alexey Khvostov, and Alexander Protopopov were executed during the infamous Red Terror, 1918-1922.

See also
 Okhrana

Notes

References
Out of My Past: The Memoirs of Count Kokovtsov Edited by H.H. Fisher and translated by Laura Matveev; Stanford University Press, 1935.
The Memoirs of Count Witte Edited and translated by Sydney Harcave; Sharpe Press, 1990.

External links
 

1845 births
1915 deaths
People from Moscow Governorate
Pyotr
Politicians of the Russian Empire
Interior ministers of Russia
Members of the State Council (Russian Empire)
Russian monarchists
Law enforcement in Russia